Nevasa taluka (Newasa), is a taluka in Shrirampur subdivision of Ahmednagar district in Maharashtra State of India. Nevasa is a place where Sant Dnyaneshwar wrote the Dnyaneshwari.

Newasa is also well known for its historical sites.

Area
The table below shows area of the taluka by land type.

Villages
There are around 120 villages in Nevasa taluka. For list of villages see Villages in Nevasa taluka.

Population
The table below shows population of the taluka by sex. The data is as per 2001 census.

Rainfall
The Table below details of rainfall from year 1981 to 2004.

See also
 Talukas in Ahmednagar district
 Villages in Nevasa taluka

References

Cities and towns in Ahmednagar district
Talukas in Ahmednagar district
Talukas in Maharashtra